Iri-ye Sofla (also Romanized as Īrī-ye Soflá, Īrī Soflá, and Īrī-e Soflá; also known as Dabari, Dab Īrī, Dībrī, Dubra, Īrī Pā’īn, and Īrī-ye Pā’īn) is a village in Dizmar-e Gharbi Rural District of Siah Rud District, Jolfa County, East Azerbaijan province, Iran. At the 2006 National Census, its population was 1,616 in 410 households. The following census in 2011 counted 1,908 people in 504 households. The latest census in 2016 showed a population of 1,800 people in 581 households; it was the largest village in its rural district.

References 

Jolfa County

Populated places in East Azerbaijan Province

Populated places in Jolfa County